Kanwari, also spelled Kunwari, or Kwari, is a village of 7,000 population, in Hansi-I Tehsil, Hisar-1 Rural Development Block, Hansi (Vidhan Sabha constituency) and Hisar (Lok Sabha constituency) of Hisar District of Hisar Division in the Haryana state of India. It is part of the saat bas bhaichara grouping of 7 villages. The village has 4 panna/patti (subdivisions), named as Nangalia Panna (dominated by Garhwal gotra ), upparla Panna (dominated by Duhan gotra), parla Panna (dominated by Sheoran gotra), etc. with a total revenue land area of 43903 kanal or 5487 acre as per HALRIS records.

History
Archaeological Survey of India's explorations, as reported in the "Indian Archaeological Review 1978-79" (page 8), found early historical and late medieval artifacts at Kanwari. Late medieval artifacts included 9th and 10th century temple [of Kaumari in Nagara architecture from the times of Tomara dynasty rule who were vassals of Pratiharas until 10th century]. The earliest extant historical reference to the Tomaras rule in Haryana occurs in the Pehowa inscription issued during the reign of the Pratihara king Mahendrapala I (r. c. 885-910 CE). Inscription states that Jaula of the Tomara family became prosperous by serving an unnamed king; and his descendants were Vajrata, Jajjuka and Gogga; Gogga was a vassal of Mahendrapala I; Gogga and his step-brothers Purna-raja and Deva-raja constructed three Vishnu temples at Prithudaka (Pehowa) on the banks of the Sarasvati River (Ghaggar River). F. Kielhorn suggested that this Tomara family actually resided in Delhi: they may have visited Pehowa on pilgrimage, and built a temple there. The medieval temple of dhok of village ancestor deity at Kanwari explored by ASI in 1978-79 is called the Bua Kanwari Dham , where newlyweds go for blessings before entering the village. Dhok is also called Bhaiyan and Jathera. Dhok (Haryanvi: धोक worship) comes from the word दहक, which means the sacred fire. Bhaiyan (Haryanvi: भईयाँ) from भूमिया means from the earth. Jathera (Punjabi: जठेरा from जेष्ठ) means the elder or ancestor. A modern temple has been built on top of the earlier temple and medieval sculptures have been preserved in the temple complex. 
The village was established by the Garhwal Kingdom ( गढ़वाल गोत्र )ancestors with likely connections with tomar kingdom of Garhwal Kingdom. 
The foundation temple put by Garhwal kingdom was name  Dada kheda  is of Garhwal Gotra.
Kanwari also has an old Baba Shri Giri Shiva temple with a monastic akhara for the sadhus (Hindu mystics).

After Independence of India in 1947, Kanwari became part of Punjab. Once Haryana was formed as a separate state in 1966, Kanwari became part of the Hisar district.

Demographics

As per a July 2010 official report, Kanwari has 1,147 households with a total population of 5,733 with 1,196 Scheduled Caste inhabitants.

As per 2001 census, Kanwari had 896 households and a population of 5,119. There were 2,712 males and 2,407 females. 835 people were below the age of 6. The number literate were 2,655, of which 1,739 were male and 916 were female. The working population was 2,581.

Kanwari is covered by The Mahatma Gandhi National Rural Employment Guarantee Act and 135 Job cards were issued under this legislation as of July 2010.

Transportation

Road
Kanwari is well-connected by the Matelled Asphalt (paved bitumen) road; five different roads converge at Kanwari. Places in clock-wise direction from Kanwari are: To North is Hisar (city) 24 km on Hisar-Tosham-Bhiwani MDR 108 (Major District Road 108). To North-East is Hansi 43 km via Umra link road number 1409. To East is Muzadpur 2 km via link road. To South are Balawas 2 km and Nalwa 4 km; further South-West continuing on the same Hisar-Tosham-Bhiwani MDR 108 (Major District Road 108) are Tosham 16 km and Bhiwani 40 km. To West is Badya Jattan 4 km via a link road, that also leads to Hisar via Mangali 15 km and Kaimri 22 km.

Train connectivity
Kanwari does not have a rail station.

Airport connectivity
Currently, there are no commercial domestic or international flights from this airport.

Administration

Geographical and electoral administration
Kanwari is under Hansi land and revenue Tehsil, Hisar-1 Rural Development Block, Hansi (Vidhan Sabha constituency) and Hisar (Lok Sabha constituency) of the Hisar District of Hisar Division in the Haryana state of India.

Panchayat and local governance
Kanwari is an administrative unit and has a democratically elected panchayat samiti (village council). Kanwari is under Hisar Zilla Panchayat parisad and Hisar block panchayat smiti, and has its own unreserved Gram Panchayat under Gram Panchayat code 25444  and census village code 00412900.

Haryana Government has appointed Mr. Pravesh s/o Dharam Vir to run Customer Service Center (CSC) to deliver e-Seva government e-services including G2C Services such as Birth certificate, death certificate, Nakal of Jamabandi, Caste certificate, etc. and B2C Services such as payment of mobile phone bills and top-ups, PAN card, Voter card for delivery through the CSCs.

Water for drinking and irrigation is sourced from Himalaya via Sunder Branch of Hansi-Butana branch of Western Yamuna Canal of Yamuna river. Electricity is distributed by the Dakshin Haryana Bijli Vitran Nigam.

Village divisions
The village is subdivided into various 'Panna' (पान्ना) or subsectors, such as 'Parla Panna' (the upper sub-sector) or Sheoran Panna (the sub-sector of the Sheoran gotra) (clan) of the Hindu Jat, 'Nichla Panna' or Garhwal Panna (the sub sector of Garhwal) where majority of the residents are Hindu Jat people of Duhan gotra and 'Bahrla Panna' (the outer subsector), each having their own community center called paras (परस) or chaupal (चौपाल).

Revenue, Agriculture, Health and Other Services
There is a Patwari (Government Land Records Officer), an Agriculture Development Officer (ADO), a Rural Health Officer (RHO), and an Anganwadi (Community Childcare) worker based at Kanwari.

There is Kanwari Yuva Mandal (Kanwari Youth club) established in 1990 by the youths of the village to spread the social awareness among the villagers about the importance of education, their rights and creation of attitude for a positive change. Currently, Baljeet Jangra is the Pardhan (Chairman) and Sudarshan Sheoran is the Cashier for the same. It received an award for the Best Yuva Mandal in the Hissar district.

Jan Sahayak e-Governance Services
Government of Haryana services are accessible via their Official website.

Government of India e-governance services can be availed online at their website for various  govt departments including land & revenue (land rights and ownership records), transport (driving license and vehicle registration), health (birth and death certificates), public health (water and sewage connection), food (ration cards), Power (electricity connection) and HUDA or Municipal Committee/council (house tax and building plans), etc.

Education

Kanwari has a two government schools, a private government approved teachers training college and few more private schools.
 Government Girl's High school (former co-ed Govt school)
 Government Senior Secondary Government school for Boys
 There are 2 private schools in the village, e.g. J.D. Senior Secondary School) 
 RDS College of Education  that imparts  Bachelor of Education (B.Ed) degrees
 There is a Government Degree college at Nalwa (6 km or 4mile from Kanwari)
 There are many more schools institutes and 3 universities at Hisar (city) (24 km or 17 miles from Kanwari).

Climate

Kanwari is a semi-arid region and agriculture is supported mainly by canals and ground water irrigation. Hot winds, locally known as 'Loo', are strong and frequent from May to July. Intermittent dust storms are common. In the winter some rain is received due to western disturbances.

The Sunder Branch of Western Yamuna Canal (originating from Yamuna river) passes through the agricultural fields of Kanwari on the eastern side between Kanwari and Muzadpur villages, and goes towards Balawas village.

Kanwari has a continental climate, with very hot summers and relatively cool winters. Summer starts in April and lasts till the middle of October. May is the hottest month, with the maximum day temperatures in the  range. Winter starts in November and is mild and sunny, although temperatures may reach freezing on some nights.

Main ecological issues are desertification, deforestation, encroachment and land grabbing of common Panchayat forest and grazing land called "bani".

Fauna
Animals and bird of various species are found including sparrow, large Indian parakeet, parrot, crow, rat, rabbit, nilgai (state animal of Haryana), pied crested cuckoo, koel, pheasant, kingfisher, bulbul and Indian magpie robin.

The national bird of India, the common peafowl (mor) is quite common and is seen in the fields and common village land.

Reptiles
Snakes: The poisonous snakes like common krait, Russel’s viper, phoorsa and other snakes like blind snake, John’s sand boa, wolf snake, rat snake and sand snake are found around the village.

Lizards
The common lizards can be seen in the houses. Kirla or girgit is found in the hedges and attracts the attention by changing its colours. Sanda is found in sandy areas.

Amphibians
Two species of tortoises found are black pond turtle and three-striped pond turtle in around village and the common frogs found in the village are Indian bull frog, Indian cricket frog, Indian burrowing frog and common toad.

In May 2007, Kanwari villagers stopped a transport truck full of cattle, rescued the cattle (which were on their way to the slaughterhouse), and set the truck on fire. The slaughter of cows is not permitted in the Hindu religion, as the cow is sacred and worshiped by the Hindus as mother (giver of life-nurturing milk).

See also

 Bidhwan
 Badya Jattan
 Badyan Brahmnan
 Balawas
 Barwas
 Pabra
 Norangpura

References

Hisar (city)
Cities and towns in Hisar district
Villages in Hisar district
Tourism in Haryana
Tourist attractions in Haryana
Hindu temples in Haryana